Sapapalii is a village on the north east coast of Savaii island in Samoa. It is the village where John Williams, the first missionary to bring Christianity to Samoa landed in 1830. Sapapali'i is in the Fa'asaleleaga political district and has a population of 896.

Sapapalii became the second Malietoa base in the district in 1750 when Malietoa Tia married a woman from the village. Their son Malietoa Fitisemanu was the father of Malietoa Vaiinupo who received Williams in 1830.

Sapapalii is 8 km north of Salelologa ferry terminal and township.

Archaeology

In the 1970s, Gregory Jackmond carried out archaeological surveys inland from Sapapali'i. Jackmond, a Peace Corps in Samoa, surveyed a 20 hectare area with extensive pre-historic settlements. Jackmond later carried out field work at Palauli on the south east coast where the Pulemelei Mound is situated.

References

Populated places in Fa'asaleleaga
Archaeological sites in Samoa